Bartholomew Versus the Wheel is a 1964 Warner Bros. Merrie Melodies cartoon directed by Robert McKimson. It was released theatrically on February 29, 1964.

The production was the second of three cartoons to use the "modern" abstract Warner Bros. opening and closing sequences created by Chuck Jones. The sequence was previously used on Now Hear This and would be used once more in Señorella and the Glass Huarache. The visual style of the cartoon was developed in the style of cartoonist and book illustrator James Grover Thurber. Thurber died in 1961, three years before the cartoon's release. The film was also the second of two Looney Tunes cartoons that were released on a leap day; the first one was Boom Boom in 1936.

Plot synopsis 
The cartoon opens with a picture of a boy, whose offscreen voice reveals himself to be the film's narrator and introduces the audience to his family's puppy, Bartholomew. When the boy's father sees Bartholomew barking at a Wild West Outlaw on the television, he states that Bartholomew might grow up to be a good watchdog. Bartholomew barks at almost everything except cats. He especially avoids barking at the family's cat, whose bigger size allows him to bully Bartholomew by eating up his dog food. Bartholomew is capable of doing tricks which impress the boy and his friends, until the cat steals away Bartholomew's audience by performing tricks of his own.

One day, Bartholomew is sitting the park peacefully watching a butterfly flying around, when an unaware toddler rides past on a scooter and accidentally runs over Bartholomew's tail, causing Bartholomew to let out a yelp of pain. After Bartholomew blows on his sore tail, he sees the scooter's wheels and, realizing that the wheels injured his tail, grows angry enough to shake all over. Then, Bartholomew runs up to the toddler and retaliates by biting and ripping off one of his scooter's wheels. The toddler starts crying because he didn't know what he had done to deserve that kind of treatment. Bartholomew then digs a hole to bury the wheel, but as he takes the scooter wheels over to the hole, another child's toy train harmlessly races past. Even though its wheels are too small to do any harm to him, Bartholomew now views all wheels as being dangerous to his safety, so he chases after the toy train and rips off its wheels. He then buries the wheels in a hole.

From then on, whenever Bartholomew sees an object with wheels, he chases after it and rips them off. While he's still a puppy, he rips off little wheels from tricycles, as when he ripped off a wheel from a tricycle belonging to a blonde girl, and bicycles, as when he ripped off one belonging to the newspaper delivery boy. As he grows up into a big dog, he switches to bigger wheels from cars (one man's car is so small that Bartholomew just takes the whole car without biting off the wheels) and trucks (though when he tries to bite off the wheel from an ACME moving van, he ends up bursting the tire and gets blown back). The only wheels he doesn't dare to bite off are the ones from the truck belonging to Mr. Wembley, the town's dog catcher, showing that while Bartholomew doesn't know the intended purpose of wheels, he's intelligent enough to know how to set boundaries.

The only wheels that Bartholomew had not ripped off are the ones on the landing gears of airplanes. So, Bartholomew goes down to the airport and sees an airplane preparing to take off. As the plane taxis to the runway, Bartholomew digs his way in under the fence and chases after the plane's wheel, but just as he gets close enough to attempt to bite it, the wheel leaves the ground as the plane takes off. However, Bartholomew does not give up. He notices another plane getting ready to take off and chases after its wheels. This time, Bartholomew succeeds in catching up to the plane's wheels, but just as he bites down on one, the wheel leaves the ground. The wheel proves to be too big to rip off, so it pulls Bartholomew into the plane's undercarriage as the plane takes off and flies.

Back home, the boy grows worried when Bartholomew doesn't come home for dinner. He calls out Bartholomew's name several times, but Bartholomew doesn't return. Despite being upset at Bartholomew for ripping off their vehicles' wheels, all the town's children and adults join in the search. They look for Bartholomew in his favorite places. The townsfolk even go so far as to call out Mr. Wembley, but Mr. Wembley says that, just like everybody else, even he's clueless as to where Bartholomew could be.

Meanwhile, it is revealed that the plane that flew away with Bartholomew was delivering aid packages (possibly Peace Corps ones) to a fictional and unnamed African nation located in the Sahara Desert and has just landed there. As Bartholomew takes in his new surroundings and wonders where he is, one man who is described by the boy as wearing only a turban and short pants comes up to Bartholomew and says something in his own language, possibly "Oooh. Bad dog!" Bartholomew then sees three attractive dogs and one similar-sized dog also wearing a turban walk by. He instantly falls in love with the three dogs, but the turban-wearing dog barks fiercely at him, as if to say "Back off. They're mine." As Bartholomew wanders around, none of the nation's people look at or pet him. Worst of all for Bartholomew, everybody uses elephants and camels for transportation (though they use modern traffic lights to control the elephant and camel traffic), so there aren't any wheels to bite off.

After spending several days wandering, Bartholomew travels back to the airport and looks at a poster advertising trips to the U.S. A. As he begins crying and wishing he could go back home, he notices another poster advertising flights. He remembers the airplane wheel that took him away from his home, then realizes that if the plane wheel had taken him here, it could possibly get him back home. Excited by his clever idea, he rushes into the airport, knocks over the man he had previously met at the gate, and bites onto the wheel of the next plane going back to the U.S. The man curses at Bartholomew, but stops when he sees the plane taking off. In his own language, he is likely saying "You stupid mongrel! How dare you knock me down! I oughta turn you into bone soup for this! Oooh! Big tin bird.".

The next day, Bartholomew arrives back in the United States and catches a train back to his hometown, where, as it turns out, all the townspeople are waiting for him. The railroad depot building is displaying a sign reading "[Tippecanoe and Bartholomew." With everybody happy to have Bartholomew home again, they forgive him for biting off all their vehicles' wheels. The mayor gives Bartholomew a ride in his open-topped limousine. To everybody's surprise, Bartholomew's unexpected trip to Africa has taught him that wheels are only good or bad depending on the people who use them. To show everybody how his opinion on wheels has changed, Bartholomew licks them as proof that he likes them. He licks the limousine's wheels, the toddler's scooters' wheels, and the blonde girl's roller-skates' wheels.

Bartholomew also has stopped hating everything else excluding cats. When Bartholomew comes home to his first meal in days, he sneaks up behind the cat, who is taking Bartholomew's dog food as usual, and barks loudly. The cat jumps and is spooked. Bartholomew then flashes a cheeky grin to show that he's in charge now. The cartoon's final scene focuses back on the boy's picture. As the boy bids the audience goodbye, his picture smiles, as if to show he knows that things will be different with Bartholomew from now on.

Cast and Crew 
 Animation - Richard Thompson, Bob Bransford, Keith Darling
 Layouts - Bob Givens
 Backgrounds - Philip Deguard
 Story - John Dunn
 Music - Bill Lava
 Voice Characterizations - Mel Blanc, Leslie Barrings
 Producer - David DePatie
 Director - Robert McKimson

Home media
The cartoon is available as an extra feature on disc four of the Looney Tunes Golden Collection: Volume 6 DVD set.

References 

 Looney Tunes: The Ultimate Visual Guide (Hardcover) by Jerry Beck, page 73

American comedy short films
1964 animated films
1964 short films
1960s Warner Bros. animated short films
Merrie Melodies short films
Warner Bros. Cartoons animated short films
Films directed by Robert McKimson
Animated films about dogs
Films scored by William Lava
1960s English-language films
1960s American films
American animated short films